Sarah Marince (born 1990) is an American TV-talent, model and entertainer from Pittsburgh, Pennsylvania. She started her career as a country singer in Pittsburgh and she self-released two country albums. Marince made her Billboard chart debut in 2010 when radio host Blair Garner played her song "In the Meantime".

Sarah Marince first stepped on stage at 13 in her hometown of Pittsburgh. She moved on to Nashville, where she earned opening slots with Taylor Swift, Kenny Chesney, Kellie Pickler, Kenny Rodgers and Pete Townsend. She has also performed alongside Martina McBride, Sara Evans and Sheryl Crow.

While in Nashville, Marince hit the country music charts with "In The Meantime", which charted on iTunes and Billboard. She followed that success with her single "Can't A Girl Change Her Mind."

She has sung the National Anthem for her hometown Pittsburgh Penguins, Steelers and Pirates as well as in the arenas of the Cleveland Cavaliers, the New York Knicks, the Mets, and the LA Clippers.

After relocating to Orlando, Marince began doing radio, television and voiceover work. She has done commercial work for Disney, Wal-Mart, Nestle, Gaylord Palms Resort, Florida Hospital and modeling work for the NFL and MLB.

In 2016, Walt Disney World hired Marince to record voiceovers for the new Star Wars shows at Disney's Hollywood Studios. Her voice can also be heard on songs for Disney's Fireworks Spectaculars and Shows in their parks here in the US and overseas.

Personal life 
Marince resides in Orlando, Florida.

Discography

Studio albums

Extended plays

Singles

Music videos

References

External links

American child singers
American country singer-songwriters
American women country singers
Living people
Musicians from Pittsburgh
1990s births
Singer-songwriters from Pennsylvania
People from Moon Township, Allegheny County, Pennsylvania
21st-century American singers
21st-century American women singers
Country musicians from Pennsylvania